Mounir Benzegala (born 7 April 1987) is an Algerian professional basketball player. He also played for the Algeria national basketball team.

Honours

Club
GS Pétroliers
Super Division: 2014, 2015, 2016.
Algerian Basketball Cup: 2013, 2014, 2015, 2016.

References

External links
 Profile basketball.afrobasket

1987 births
Living people
Algerian men's basketball players
Point guards
21st-century Algerian people